John Stocks may refer to:

John Ellerton Stocks (1822–1854), English botanist
John Leofric Stocks (1882–1937), British philosopher
John Stocks (priest), English archdeacon of Leicester
John Stocks (politician), former executive director of the National Education Association

See also
John Stock (disambiguation)